The os clitoridis (also called the os clitoris or baubellum) is a bone inside the clitoris of many mammalian taxa. It is absent from the human clitoris, but present in the clitoris of some primates, such as the ring-tailed lemurs. It is homologous to the baculum in male mammals.

The structure is more evolutionarily labile than the baculum, exhibiting both more inherent variability and more gains and losses over time, which has been interpreted as evidence for its non-functionality.

Other work posits that the variation in the os clitoridis could be driven by intersexual conflict, lock-and-key genital evolution, and cryptic female choice, especially given the high level of variation within species as well as between them.

References 

Clitoris
Mammal anatomy